Angelo Iorio (born 26 August 1982) is an Italian footballer who plays for Serie B club Grosseto.

Biography
Born in Genoa, Liguria, Iorio started his career with Genoa C.F.C. In 2002–03 season, he was signed by Serie C2 club Cremonese. He was loaned back to Genoa in 2003–04 season. On 1 July 2004 he returned to Cremonese and won Serie C1 champion in 2005.

After a Serie B season with Cremonese which the team finished as the second from the bottom, he was signed by Piacenza in co-ownership deal. On 26 August 2008, Piacenza bought him outright by submitted a higher price to Lega Calcio in a closed tender.

In July 2010, he left for fellow Serie B team Grosseto.

International career
He played 2 matches in 2001 UEFA European Under-18 Football Championship qualification. He also played for Italy under-21 Serie B representative team against Romania U21 in 2002.

References

External links
 Football.it Profile 
 FIGC 
 La Gazzetta dello Sport Profile (2006–07 season) 
 La Gazzetta dello Sport Profile (2007–08 season) 
 La Gazzetta dello Sport Profile 
 

Italian footballers
Serie B players
Genoa C.F.C. players
U.S. Cremonese players
Piacenza Calcio 1919 players
F.C. Grosseto S.S.D. players
Association football central defenders
Footballers from Genoa
1982 births
Living people